Xenogenes is a genus of moths in the family Erebidae. The genus was erected by Edward Meyrick in 1910. Both species are found in Australia.

Species
Xenogenes chrysoplaca Meyrick, 1910 Queensland
Xenogenes gloriosa (T. P. Lucas, 1891) New South Wales, Queensland

References

Oenochrominae